Intermix was a side project of Canadian industrial musicians Bill Leeb and Rhys Fulber in the 1990s that initially focused on techno, but included a more ambient style on their last album.

Background
Industrial musician Chris Peterson, longstanding member of Front Line Assembly and related side projects, is credited with mixing duties on the first two albums.

Discography

Albums

Singles

Music videos

References

Canadian techno music groups
Musical groups from Vancouver
Musical groups established in 1992
Musical groups disestablished in 1995
Third Mind Records artists
1992 establishments in British Columbia
1995 disestablishments in Canada